This is a list of aircraft manufacturers sorted alphabetically by International Civil Aviation Organization (ICAO)/common name. It contains the ICAO/common name, manufacturers name(s), country and other data, with the known years of operation in parentheses.

The ICAO names are listed in bold. Having an ICAO name does not mean that a manufacturer is still in operation today, just that some of the aircraft produced by that manufacturer are still flying.

0—9
 3Xtrim Aircraft Factory (Zaklady Lotnicze 3Xtrim Sp z oo) (Poland) – From Wytwórnia i Naprawa Konstrukcji Lekkich 1999, currently operational

A
 Aachen Flugzeugbau (Germany) – founded 1914, renamed Aachener Segelflugzeugbau in 1921
 Abrams Air Craft Corporation (US), formed 1937, defunct 1940
ABS Aerolight, Sérignan-du-Comtat, France
ABS, ABS Aircraft – Germany, (1985–?)
ABS, ABS Aircraft AG – Switzerland, (1985–?)
AC Mobil 34, AC Mobil 34 – France
ACAZ – Ateliers de Construction Aéronautique de Zeebruges, Belgium
ACBA, Aéro Club de Bas Armagnac – France
Ace, Ace Aircraft Manufacturing and Supply – United States
Ace, Ace Aircraft Manufacturing Company – United States, (1929–1931) > Corben Aircraft Company
Ace, Ace Aircraft Manufacturing Inc – United States
Aceair, Aceair SA – Switzerland
Aces High, Aces High Light Aircraft Ltd – Canada
Advance Thun, Thun, Switzerland
ACS, Advanced Composites Solutions – United States
ACME, Air Craft Marine Engineering – United States, (1954–?)
Airdale Sportplane and Supply, Rhinelander, Wisconsin, United States
Airo Aviation, Ras Al Khaimah Free Trade Zone, United Arab Emirates
Acme, Acme Aircraft Corp – United States, (1929–?)
Acro Sport, Acro Sport Inc – United States, (?-present)
AD Aerospace, AD Aerospace Ltd – United Kingdom
Aero East Europe, Kraljevo, Serbia
ADA, Aeronautical Development Agency – India, (1984–present)
Aero Nord, Lorgies, and later Bénifontaine, France
Adam (1), Roger Adam – France, (1948–1955)
Adam (2), Adam Aircraft Industries LLC – United States, (1998, defunct 2008) (AAI)
Adamoli-Cattani, Adamoli-Cattani – Italy
Adams Aero, Adams Aeronautics Company, Inc – United States
Adams-Wilson, Adams-Wilson Helicopters Inc – United States
Adaro, Adaro – Spain
ADC Aircraft, Aircraft Disposals Company – United Kingdom, (1920–1930)
Adcox, Adcox Aviation Trade School – United States
Adkisson, Earl and Jerry Adkisson – United States
Ader, Clement, France, (1886–1897)
Adler, Adler (Adlerwerke vorm Heinrich Kleyer) – Germany, (1934–?)
Admiralty, British Admiralty Air Department – United Kingdom, (AD)
 Advanced Aerodynamics and Structures, Inc. (AASI) (US) – founded 1989, renamed to Mooney Aerospace Group in 2002
Advanced Aeromarine, Advanced Aeromarine – United States, > Keuthan Aircraft
Advanced Aircraft Corporation (AAC) – United States
Advanced Amphibious Aircraft (AAA) – Germany/Italy, (1988–1994)
Advanced Aviation, Advanced Aviation Inc – United States
Advanced Soaring Concepts, Advanced Soaring Concepts – United States
Adventure Air, Adventure Air – United States
Adventure SA, Méré, Yonne, France
AD-Y, Antonov Dnipropetrovsk-Pivdenmash – Ukraine
AEA, Aeronautical Engineers Australia Research Pty Ltd – Australia, (1978–present)
AEA, Aerial Experiment Association – Canada, (1907–1909) > Curtiss Aeroplane and Motor Company
AEC, Aircraft Engineering Corp – United States
AEG, Allgemeine Elektrizitäts-Gesellschaft – Germany, (1910–1918) (General Electricity Company)
AEKKEA-RAAB, AEKKEA – Greece (1935–1940)
AER, Aer Aircraft Corp. – United States
Aer Lualdi, Aer Lualdi & C SpA – Italy
Aer Pegaso, Aer Pegaso – Argentina
Aerauto, Aerauto – Italy, (1950–1953)
Aereon, Aereon – United States, (1967–?)
Aerfer, Aerfer-Industrie Aerospaziali Meridionali SpA – Italy, (1955–1969) > Aeritalia
Aerfer, Aerfer-Industrie Meccaniche Aeronautiche Meridionali SpA – Italy
Aerfer-Aermacchi, see AERFER and AERMACCHI – Italy
Aerial Distributors, Aerial Distributors – United States, (1967–?)
Aerial Service Corporation, Aerial Service Corporation – United States, (1920–?) > Mercury Aircraft
Aériane, Aériane – Belgium
Aeritalia, Aeritalia-Società Aerospaziale Italiana pA – Italy, (1969–1981) > Alenia Aeronautica
Aeritalia-Aermacchi, see AERITALIA and AERMACCHI – Italy
Aermacchi, Aermacchi SpA – Italy, (1913–present)
Aermatica Spa, Italy, (2008–present)
Aermacchi, Aeronautica Macchi SpA – Italy
Aero (1), Aero Design and Engineering Company – United States, (1944–1960) > Rockwell
Aero (2), Aero Vodochody AS – Czech Republic, (1994–present)
Aero (2), Aero Vodochody Národní Podnik – Czechoslovakia/Czech Republic, (1919–1994)
Aero (3), Aero Sp z oo – Poland
Aero Adventure, Aero Adventure Inc – United States
A.E.R.O. Aircraft Services, LLC, United States – manufacturer of Lake amphibian aircraft
Aero Boero, Aero Boero SA – Argentina, (1952–present)
Aero Boero, Aero Boero SRL – Argentina
Aero Boero, Aero Talleres Boero SRL – Argentina
Aero Bravo, Aerobravo Industria Aeronautica Ltda – Brazil, (1993–present)
Aero Commander, Aero Commander Inc – United States
Aero Composites, Aero Composites – United States
Aero Designs, Aero Designs Inc – United States
Aerodyne Technologies, Talloires, France
Aero Gare, Aero Gare – United States
Aero Jaen, Aeronautica de Jaen – Spain
Aero Kuhlmann, Aero Kuhlmann – France
Aero Mercantil, Aero Mercantil SA – Colombia
Aero Mirage, Aero Mirage Inc – United States
Aero Mod, Aero Mod General – United States
Aero Resources – US
Aero Spacelines, Aero Spacelines Inc – United States, (1961–1974) > Tracor
AeroCad, AeroCad Inc – United States
Aero-Cam, Aero-Cam Pty Ltd – (South Africa)
Aerocar, Aerocar Inc – United States
Aerocar International, Aerocar International – United States, (1945–1961)
Aérocentre, Société Nationale de Constructions Aéronautiques du Centre – France, (SNCAC)
Aerochute International, Coburg North, Victoria, Australia
Aero-Club, Aero-Club der Schweiz – Switzerland
Aerocomp, Aerocomp Inc – United States
Aero-Composites, Aero-Composites Technologies Inc – United States
Aero-Craft, Aero-Craft – Unknown
Aero-Difusión, Aero-Difusión SL – Spain (1955– )
Aérodis, Aérodis SARL – France
Aero-Flight, Aero-Flight – United States
Aerion Corporation – United States
Aero-Jodel, Aero Flugzeugbau Hubert Zuerl – Germany
Aerokopter, OOO Aerokopter – Ukraine
AeroLites, Aerolites Inc – United States
Aeromarine, Aeromarine Plane and Motor Co. – United States, (1908–1935) (Prior to 1914 was the Boland Aeroplane and Motor Co.) > Burnelli
Aeromarine-LSA, South Lakeland Airport, Florida, United States
Aeromere, Aeromere SpA – Italy
Aeromot, Aeromot Industria Mecanico- Ltda – Brazil
Aeromot, Aeronaves e Motores SA – Brazil
 Aeronautica Agrícola Mexicana SA (AAMSA) (Mexico) – founded 1971, dissolved 1984
Aeronautical Engineering Co., Aeronautical Engineering Co. – United States
Aeroneering – United States
Aeronca, Aeronautical Corporation of America – United States, (1928–1951)
Aeronca, Aeronca Manufacturing Corporation – United States
Aeroplastika, Aeroplastika – Lithuania
Aeropract, Aeropract JSC – Russia
Aeropract, KB Aeropract – Russia
Aeropract, LM Aeropract Samara – Russia
Aeropract, OKB Aeroprakt – Russia
Aeropract, Aeroprakt Firma – Ukraine
Aeropract, Aeroprakt ooo – Ukraine
Aeropro, Aeropro sro – Slovakia
Aeroprogress, Aeroprogress Corporation – Russia
Aeroric, Aeroric Nauchno-Proizvodstvennoye Predpriyatie OOO – Russia
Aero-Service Jacek Skopiński, Warsaw, Poland
AEROSPACE MANUFACTURING Inc United States
Aeros, Aeros – Ukraine
Aerospace General – (US)
Aérospatiale, Société Nationale Industrielle Aerospatiale – France, (1970–1999) (SONACA) > Aérospatiale-Matra
Aérospatiale-Matra, Aérospatiale-Matra – France, (1999–2000) > EADS
Aerospool, Aerospool spol sro – Slovakia
Aerosport, Aerosport Inc – United States
Aerosport OY, Keila, Estonia
Aerostar, SC Aerostar SA – Romania
Aerostar Aircraft, Aerostar Aircraft Corporation – United States
Aérostructure, Aérostructure SARL – France
Aerosud, Aerosud – (South Africa)
Aerotaller, Aerotaller – Argentina
Aerotec, Aerotec SA Industria Aeronáutica – Brazil, (1962–1987)
Aerotechnik, Aerotechnik CZ SRO – Czech Republic
Aerotécnica – Spain
Aerotek (1), Aerotek Inc – United States
Aerotek (2), Aeronautical Systems Technology – (South Africa)
Aero-Volga, NPO Aero-Volga – Russia
Aesl, Aero Engine Services Ltd – New Zealand
AFIC, AFIC Pty Ltd – (South Africa)
AFU – Switzerland
Ag-Cat, Ag-Cat Corporation – United States
AGO Flugzeugwerke, Ago Flugzeugwerke – Germany
Agro-Copteros, Agro-Copteros Ltda – Colombia
Agrolot, Fundacja Agrolot – Poland
Agrolot, Wyposazen Agrolotniczych – Poland
Agusta, Agusta SpA – Italy, (1907–present)
Agusta, Agusta, Division of Leonardo – Italy
Agusta, Costruzioni Aeronautiche Giovanni Agusta SpA – Italy
Ahrens, Ahrens Aircraft Corp. – United States (1975–?)
AI(R), Aero International (Regional) – UK/France/Italy
AIAA, Atelier Industriel de l'Aéronautique d'Alger – Algeria, (1948–1960)
Aichi Kokuki, Aichi Kokuki KK – Japan, (1931–1945) (Aichi Aircraft Company)
AICSA, Aero Industrial Colombiana SA – Colombia
AIDC, Aero Industry Development Center – Republic of China (Taiwan)
AIDC, Aerospace Industrial Development Corporation – Republic of China (Taiwan)
AIEP, Aeronautical Industrial Engineering and Project Management Company Ltd – Nigeria
AII, Aviation Industries of Iran – Iran, (1993–present)
AIL, Aeronautics (India) Ltd – India
AIR, Aircraft Investor Resources LLC – United States
Air & Space, Air & Space America Inc – United States
Air & Space, Air & Space Manufacturing Inc – United States
Air Command, Air Command International Inc – United States
Air Parts, Air Parts (NZ) Ltd – New Zealand
Air Products, Air Products Company Inc – United States
Air Tractor, Air Tractor Inc – United States, (1972–present)
Airbridge – Moscow, Russia
Airbus, Airbus SAS – European Union, (1970–present)
Airbus, GIE Airbus Industrie – European Union
Airco, Aircraft Manufacturing Company – United Kingdom, (1912–1920) > de Havilland
Airconcept, Airconcept Flugzeug und Gerätebau GmbH und Co KG – Germany
 Aircraft Armaments Incorporated (AAI) (US) – founded 1950, renamed to AAI Corporation 1985
Aircraft Cooperative, Aircraft Cooperative – United States
Aircraft Designs, Aircraft Designs Inc – United States, (1986–present) (ADI)
Aircraft Hydro-Forming, Aircraft Hydro-Forming Inc – United States
Aircraft Parts, Aircraft Parts and Development Corporation – United States
Aircraft Spruce & Specialty Co, Aircraft Spruce & Specialty Company – United States
Aircraft Technologies, Aircraft Technologies Inc – United States
Airfer, (Airfer Paramotores, Paramotores Air-Future, S.L.''), Pontevedra, SpainAir-Fouga, Air-Fouga – France
Airframes Unlimited, Athens, Texas, United StatesAirLony Aircraft Company – Czech Republic
Airmak, Capua, ItalyAirmaster, Airmaster Inc – United StatesAirplane Factory, The, Tedderfield Airpark, Eikenhof, Johannesburg South, South Africa
Air Plum, Fourilles, France
Airspeed, Airspeed Ltd – United Kingdom, (1931–1951) > de Havilland
Air-Sport, Zakopane, PolandAirsport sro, Zbraslavice, Czech Republic
Air Sylphe, Villereau, Nord, FranceAirtech (1), Airtech Canada Aviation Services Ltd – CanadaAirtech (2), Aircraft Technology Industries – Indonesia/Spain
Airtime Products, Airlie Beach, Queensland, Australia
Airwave Gliders, Fulpmes, Austria
Airways International, United StatesAISA, Aeronautica Industrial SA – SpainAJEP, AJEP Developments – United KingdomAJI, American Jet Industries Inc – United StatesAkaflieg Berlin, Akademische Fliegergruppe Berlin eV – Germany
Akaflieg Braunschweig, Akaflieg Braunschweig – GermanyAkaflieg Darmstadt, Akademische Fliegergruppe Darmstadt eV – Germany
Akaflieg Hannover, Akaflieg Hannover – GermanyAkaflieg Karlsruhe, Akademische Fliegergruppe Karlsruhe eV – GermanyAkaflieg Munchen, Akademische Fliegergruppe München eV – Germany
Akaflieg Stuttgart, Akaflieg Stuttgart – GermanyAkron, Akron Aircraft Company Inc – United StatesAkrotech, Akrotech Aviation Inc – United StatesAkrotech Europe, Akrotech Europe SA – FranceAlanne, Pentti Alanne – Finland
Alaparma – ItalyAlbastar Ltd, Zgornje Gorje, Slovenia
Albatros, Fabrika aviona Albatros – Yugoslavia
Albatros Flugzeugwerke, Albatros Flugzeugwerke – Germany, (1910–1931) > Focke-Wulf
Albatros-Flugzeugwerke, Ostdeutsche Albatros Werke – Germany, (East German Albatros Works)
Albaviation, Corropoli, ItalyAlenia, Alenia – Italy, (1981–present)Alenia, Alenia Aerospazio, Division of Leonardo – Italy
Alexander Aircraft Company, Englewood/Colorado Springs, Colorado – United States (1926–1932)Alfa-M, Alfa-M Nauchno-Proizvodstvennoye Predpriyatie AOOT – Russia
Alisport, Alisport – Italy
All American – US
Alliance Aeroplane Company, Alliance Aeroplane Company Ltd, United Kingdom
Alliant Aviation, Richland, Michigan, United States
Alliant Techsystems, Alliant Techsystems – United States
 Allied Aerospace Industries – United States, (?-present)
 Allied Aviation – United StatesAllison, Allison Gas Turbine Division GMC – United StatesAlon, Alon Inc – United States, (1964–1967) > MooneyAlpavia, Alpavia SA – France, (1959–1966) > Sportavia-PutzerAlpavia, Société Alpavia – FranceAlpha, Alpha – PolandAlpi, Alpi Aviation Srl – ItalyAlpla, Alpla-Werke Alwin Lechner OHG – AustriaAltair Coelho, Eldorado do Sul, Brazil
 AltiGator (2008–present), Amphios SPRL - BelgiumAlturair, Alturair – United StatesAlvarez, Joseph P. Alvarez – United StatesAmax, Amax Engineering – AustraliaAmbrosini, Societa Aeronautica Italiana Ing. A. Ambrosini & Companie – Italy, (1934–1958)Amc, Aircraft Manufacturing Company – United States, (1917–1920)Amd, Aircraft Manufacturing and Development Company Inc – United StatesAmeagle, AmEagle Corporation – United StatesAmerican Aerolights, United StatesAmerican, American Aviation Corporation – United StatesAmerican Affordable, American Affordable Aircraft – United States, (AAA)American Aircraft, American Aircraft Inc – United States
American Airmotive – United States
Ameri-Cana Ultralights – CanadaAmerican Autogyro, American Autogyro Inc – United StatesAmerican Champion, American Champion Aircraft Corporation – United StatesAmerican Eagle, American Eagle Aircraft Corporation – United StatesAmerican General, American General Aircraft Company – United StatesAmerican Homebuilts, Hebron, Illinois, United StatesAmerican Sportscopter, American Sportscopter Inc – United StatesAmerican Utilicraft, American Utilicraft Corporation – United States
Ameur Aviation SA (or simply "Ameur") – France
Ameur Aviation Technologie (or simply "Ameur") – France
Amiot, Amiot – France, (1915–1945) (Amiot-Peneau) > Ateliers Aeronautiques de Colombes, SNCAC
Amoy, Amoy – Unknown, (1930–1935)
Amphibian Airplanes of Canada (AAC) – Canada, (1998–?)AMS-Flight, AMS-Flight DOO – SloveniaAMX, AMX International Ltd – Italy/BrazilAnahuac, Fabrica de Aviones Anahuac SA – Mexico
Anatra – Russia
ANBO – Antanas Gustaitis at the Lithuanian Army Aviation Workshops – LithuaniaAnderson, Anderson Aircraft Corporation – United StatesAnderson, Earl Anderson – United StatesAnderson-Greenwood, Anderson, Greenwood and Company – United StatesAndreasson, Björn Andreasson – Sweden
ANF Mureaux, ANF Mureaux – France, (1918–1937) > SNCANAngel, Angel Aircraft Corporation – United StatesAnglin, Anglin Engineering – United StatesAnglin, Anglin Special Aero Planes Inc – United States
Anglo Normandy, Anglo Normandy Aero Engineering – United Kingdom
ANG PATRIOT UKRAINE LLC, Brovary, Kyiv region, Ukraine (angpatriotua . com)
Ansaldo – Italy, (1916–1928)
Antoinette, Antoinette – France, (1906–1912)Antoniewski, Tomek Antoniewski – PolandAntonov, Antonov OKB – Ukraine, (1947–present)Antonov Company (before 2010 Aviatsijnyy Naukovo-Tekhnichnyy Kompleks Imeni O.K. Antonova) – UkraineAOI, Arab Organisation for Industrialisation, Aircraft Factory – (Egypt)
Apco Aviation, Caesarea, Israel
Apex Aircraft – FranceApollo Ultralight Aircraft, Eger, HungaryApplebay Sailplanes, Albuquerque, New Mexico, United StatesApplegate & Weyant, Applegate & Weyant – United StatesAquila, Aquila Technische Entwicklungen GmbH – Germany
 Arab British Helicopter Company (ABHCO) (Egypt)Arado, Arado Flugzeugwerke GmbH – Germany, (1925–1945)Arc Atlantique, Arc Atlantique Aviation – FranceArctic, Arctic Aircraft Company – United States
Arey, Krasnoyarsk, RussiaARDC, Air Force Research and Development Center – Philippines
Arkhangelski, Arkhangelski OKB – Russia
Armstrong Siddeley, Armstrong Siddeley – United Kingdom, Possibly engine makerArmstrong Whitworth, Sir W. G. Armstrong Whitworth Aircraft Ltd – United Kingdom, (1913–1958) > Hawker SiddeleyArnet Pereyra, Arnet Pereyra Aero Design – United States
Arocet – United States
Arpin, M. B. Arpin & Co. – United KingdomArrow (1), Arrow Airplane & Motors Corporation – United StatesArrow (2), Arrow Aircraft Company – Canada
Arrow Aircraft, Arrow Airplane Company – United States, (1931–1935)
Arrow Aircraft Ltd. – United Kingdom
Arsenal de l'Aeronautique, Arsenal de l'Aeronautique – France, (1936–1953) > SFECMASARV, ARV Aviation Ltd – United KingdomASAP, Aircraft Sales & Parts – Canada
ASJA – SwedenASL, ASL Hagfors Aero AB – SwedenAsso Aerei, Asso Aerei Srl – ItalyAssociated Air, Associated Air – United StatesASTA, Aerospace Technologies of Australia Pty Ltd – Australia, (1987–present)
Astra, Astra Societe de Constructions Aeronautiques – France, (1909–1921) > Nieuport
ATB, First Naval Air Technical Bureau (abbreviated Kugisho) – Japan, (1969–1996) > Aeronautical Development AgencyATEC v.o.s., Libice nad Cidlinou, Czech Republic
Ateliers Aeronautiques de Colombes, Ateliers Aeronautiques de Colombes – France, −1945
 Ateliers Aéronautiques de Suresnes (AAS) (France) – founded 1945, now defunct
Ateliers, Ateliers de Construction Aéronautique de Zeebrugge – Belgium, (1923–1933) (ACAZ) (Zeebrugge Aeronautical Construction Company) (ZACCO)
Atlantic-Fokker, Atlantic Fokker Corporation (American Fokker) – United States
Atlas, Atlas Aircraft Company – US (1948)Atlas, Atlas Aircraft Corporation of South Africa (Pty) Ltd – (South Africa), (1965–present)Atlas, Atlas Aviation (Pty) Ltd – (South Africa)Atlas, Atlas Aviation, Division of Denel (Pty) Ltd – (South Africa)ATR, GIE Avions de Transport Régional – France/Italy, (1981–present)
Aubert, Aubert Aviation – France, (1932–1940, 1945–1959)
Aurora Flight Sciences, Aurora Flight Sciences Corp. – United States (1989–present)
Aurore Sarl, Sauvagnon, France
Auster, Auster Aircraft Ltd – United Kingdom, (1946–1961)Austflight, Austflight ULA Pty Ltd – Australia
Austin Motors, Austin Motors Ltd. – United Kingdom
Australian Aircraft & Engineering, Australian Aircraft & Engineering – Australia, (1910–1923)
Australian Aircraft Consortium, Australian Aircraft Consortium – Australia, (1982–1985) (A joint venture between the Government Aircraft Factories, the Commonwealth Aircraft Corporation and Hawker de Havilland.) > Hawker de HavillandAustralian Aircraft Kits, Taree, New South Wales, Australia
Australian Autogyro – Australia (1984–?)Australite, Australite Inc – United States
Auto-Aero, Auto-Aero – Hungary
AutoGyro GmbH, Hildesheim, Germany
Av8er Limited, Woodford Halse, Northamptonshire, United KingdomAvcraft, AvCraft Aviation LLC – United States
AVE, Advanced Vehicle Engineers – United States, (1971–1973)Avia (1), Azionari Vercellese Industrie Aeronautiche – ItalyAvia (2), Avia-Zavody Jirího Dimitrova – Czechoslovakia, (1919–1958)Avia (3), Nauchno-Proizvodstvennoe Obedinenie Avia – RussiaAvia Baltika, Avia Baltika Aviation Ltd – LithuaniaAviabellanca, AviaBellanca Aircraft Corporation – United States, (1983–present)
Aviafiber – SwitzerlandAviamilano, Aviamilano Costruzioni Aeronautiche SRL – Italy, (1959–?)Aviastroitel, AviaStroitel Ltd – RussiaAviat, Aviat Aircraft Inc – United StatesAviat, Aviat Inc – United States
Aviatik, Österreichische-Ungarische Flugzeugfabrik Aviatik – Austria, (1910–1918) (Automobil und Aviatik)Aviatika, Aviatika JSC – RussiaAviatika, Kontsern Aviatika – RussiaAviation, Aviaton Nauchno-Proizvodstvennaya Aviatsionnaya Firma – Russia
 Aviation Association Ilyushin (Russia) – Formed 1992
Aviation Composite Technology, Aviation Composite Technology – Philippines, (1990–?) (ACT)Aviation Development, Aviation Development International Ltd – United StatesAviation Farm, Aviation Farm Ltd – Poland
Aviation Industries of Iran, Iran
Aviation Normand Dube, Sainte-Anne-des-Plaines, Quebec, CanadaAviation Scotland, Aviation Scotland Ltd – United KingdomAviation Traders, Aviation Traders (Engineering) Ltd – United Kingdom, (1949–1962)
Avibras, Avribras Aeroespacial SA – Brazil, (1963–1967) (Aviation Brazil)Avid, Avid Aircraft Inc – United StatesAvioane Craiova, SC Avioane Craiova SA – RomaniaAviones Colombia, Aviones de Colombia SA – ColombiaAvions Fairey, Avions Fairey SA – Belgium, (1931–1978) > AêrospatialeAvions Fairey, Fairey SA – Belgium
Avions JDM – FranceAviotechnica, Aviotechnica Ltd – Bulgaria/RussiaAvipro, AviPro Aircraft Ltd – United States
AVIS, AVIS Aircraft – Unknown, (1917–1923) -1941Avro, A. V. Roe & Company – United Kingdom, (1910–1963) > Hawker SiddeleyAvro, A. V. Roe & Company Ltd – United KingdomAvro, Avro International Aerospace Ltd – United Kingdom
Avro Canada, Avro Aircraft Canada – Canada, (1945–1962) > Hawker SiddeleyAvtek, Avtek Corporation – United StatesAyres''', Ayres Corporation – United States, (?-2001) > Thrush Aircraft
Azalea Aviation, Adel, Georgia, United States

See also
 Aircraft
 List of aircraft engine manufacturers
 List of aircraft manufacturers

A